Perumalpillai Radhakrishnan (born 30 April 1941) was a Sri Lankan politician and the Deputy Minister for Vocational and Technical Training. Radhakrishnan served on the Consultative Committee on Religious Affairs and Moral Upliftment. He was also a member of a 5 persons special panel appointed by The President to look into the spate of kidnapping and murders during the height of the civil war.

References

Sri Lankan Tamil politicians
Sri Lankan Hindus
Living people
Members of the 12th Parliament of Sri Lanka
Members of the 13th Parliament of Sri Lanka
United People's Freedom Alliance politicians
1941 births